The Belfast City Bruins are an ice hockey team in the Irish Ice Hockey League. They were coached by Gordon Ferguson.

History
The Bruins were created in February 2007 to represent Belfast in the Irish Ice Hockey League. Another organization, the Belfast Giants, represent Belfast in the British Elite League. Three of the Bruins most notable players, Johnson, Stewart, and Martin transferred from the Giants upon the league's formation, also Hamill. Their logo is modeled after the NHL's Boston Bruins. However, the team shares no developmental relationship with Boston Bruins farm system.

References

External links
Belfast City Bruins Official
Irish Ice Hockey Association

Ice hockey teams in Ireland
Sports teams in Northern Ireland
Sports clubs in Belfast